Dirk is a stage play adapted from the novel Dirk Gently's Holistic Detective Agency by Douglas Adams.

History
The original adaptation was by James Goss and Arvind Ethan David while still at school in 1991. In this form it was less than an hour long and "amusing but utterly incomprehensible".

The same team expanded the script and, with the assistance of producer Matt Wreford, staged a student production from 30 May to 3 June 1995 at the Old Fire Station Theatre in Oxford.

The production made use of computer animation to display some of the difficult scenes and concepts and was generally regarded as a success. SFX magazine said "As fine a piece of science fiction theatre as you are likely to find anywhere."

Douglas Adams attended the last night and was delighted with the production.

It was revived again in 1997 but this time at the Oxford Playhouse, running from 5 November–8 November. Again Douglas Adams was in the audience and this was said to have got him thinking about a movie of Dirk Gently.

There was a further staging at Imperial College London on 8–11 December 1999.

After Adams's death in 2001, a smaller scale production was staged as a tribute at the Unicorn Theatre, Abingdon by the Old Gaol Theatre Company, running from the 5 December–8 December. The director was a friend of the Adams family and the last night was attended by Douglas's sister, Sue and James Thrift, Douglas's half-brother.
This production used none of the computer effects of previous ones and relied heavily on the audience's familiarity with the story. A sofa, which forms a significant plot item in the book, was wedged in the staircase into the theatre so patrons had to climb over it to get to their seats.

Also in 2001, Dirk went international, with a production by the Vagabond Theatre company running in Perth, Western Australia from 14 June–30 June. The production was directed by Jo Marsh and starred Cavan Gallagher as Dirk Gently.

The first American production ran from 29 September to 12 December 2006 at the Road Theatre Company, North Hollywood, California.

Differences from the book

In converting a very complex book into a play lasting 1–2 hours (depending on version) it was inevitable that some elements would have to be left out.

The biggest change is that the Electric Monk is left out completely. Apart from the difficulty of having a character on a horse in a stageplay, a large amount of the book concerning the monk is purely descriptive with little dialogue so he had to go. This in itself has knock-on effects for other characters and a further major change is that Michael Wenton-Weakes now becomes the murderer of Gordon Way.

The book appears to take place in an alternate universe whereas the play is in our universe and the paradoxes regarding Bach and Coleridge do not exist. 

Another problem exists in the scene where Dirk and Richard are walking along the bank of the Grand Union Canal and Richard is supposed to dive in the canal when he hears the words "My old maiden Aunt who lived in Winnipeg". It would be rather difficult to have a canal on stage so this is replaced by Richard dancing the Bossa Nova and many people remember this as one of the funniest parts of the play.

External links 
 The "Official" Dirk Site (archived)
 The Old Gaol Theatre Company (archived)
 The Road Theatre Company Production (archived)
 Douglasadams.eu Dirk Gently section.

1995 plays
Dirk Gently
English plays
Science fiction theatre